Míchael Umaña Corrales (born 16 July 1982) is a Costa Rican professional footballer who last played as a defender for Comunicaciones in the Liga Nacional. He represented the Costa Rica national team.

Club career

Early career
Born in Santa Ana, Umaña played for Carmelita and Herediano in his native Costa Rica before coming to the United States in 2005 to play on loan in Major League Soccer with Los Angeles Galaxy.

Umaña was released by Galaxy after the 2005 season after an unsuccessful campaign, and returned to Costa Rica to play for Brujas. He moved back to Herediano in 2006, but asked the club to be transferlisted after a move to Israeli side MS Ironi Ashdod fell through.

He eventually transferred to Liberia Mia in 2007, where he spent the next three seasons.

Chivas USA
After winning the 2009 Torneo Verano of the Primera División de Costa Rica in with Liberia Mia, Umaña returned to the United States in 2010 to play for his former club's cross-town rivals, Chivas USA. Umaña scored his first goal with Chivas USA in a Superliga 2010 match against Puebla. Umaña spent the 2010 and 2011 seasons with Chivas USA.

Central America
In January 2012, after his release from Chivas, he signed with Guatemalan side Comunicaciones and a year later he returned to Costa Rica to play for Saprissa.

Persepolis
On 17 August 2014, Umaña joined Persepolis after passing medical tests, thus became the inaugural Costa Rican footballer to play in Iran. He signed a two-year contract with the club and was given the number 4 shirt. He made his debut for the club on 25 August in a 1–1 draw against Padideh.

International career

Umaña played for the Costa Rica national team at various youth levels, and was part of their squad at the 2004 Summer Olympics.

He made his senior debut in a June 2004 friendly match against Nicaragua and has, as of October 2017, earned a total of 103 caps, scoring one goal. He played at the 2005 UNCAF Nations Cup and the 2005 CONCACAF Gold Cup before becoming part of the senior squad for the 2006 FIFA World Cup qualification campaign. He played in all three of Costa Rica's group matches at the 2006 FIFA World Cup, as the team was eliminated without winning a point.

In June 2014, Umaña was named in Costa Rica's squad for the 2014 FIFA World Cup. In the team's first two group matches, he and his central defensive colleagues Giancarlo González and Óscar Duarte allowed only one goal as Los Ticos beat Uruguay (3–1) and Italy (1–0) to qualify for the knockout stage. During the round of 16, Umaña converted Costa Rica's decisive fifth kick in a 5–3 penalty shoot-out defeat of Greece. In the quarter-final against the Netherlands, Umaña was one of two Costa Ricans to have his kick saved by Tim Krul in a 3–4 shoot-out loss.

Career statistics

Club

1 Includes U.S. Open Cup and Hazfi Cup.
2 Includes UNCAF Interclub Cup, North American SuperLiga, CONCACAF Champions League and AFC Champions League.
3 Includes four matches in league play-offs.

International goals
Scores and results list Costa Rica's goal tally first.

Personal life
Umaña is the youngest of three brothers; his brother Erick played in the Costa Rican second division.

Honours

Los Angeles Galaxy
 U.S. Open Cup: 2005
 MLS Cup: 2005
 Western Conference Championship: 2005

Individual
 CONCACAF Gold Cup Best XI (Honorable Mention): 2005

See also 
 List of men's footballers with 100 or more international caps

References

External links

 
 2006 World Cup profile - Nación 
 
 Profile at Nacion.com 
 All-Time MLS Player Register

1982 births
Living people
People from San José Province
Association football defenders
Costa Rican footballers
Costa Rica international footballers
Olympic footballers of Costa Rica
Footballers at the 2004 Summer Olympics
2004 Copa América players
2005 UNCAF Nations Cup players
2005 CONCACAF Gold Cup players
2006 FIFA World Cup players
2007 UNCAF Nations Cup players
2007 CONCACAF Gold Cup players
2009 UNCAF Nations Cup players
2013 Copa Centroamericana players
2013 CONCACAF Gold Cup players
2014 FIFA World Cup players
2015 CONCACAF Gold Cup players
Copa América Centenario players
2017 Copa Centroamericana players
2017 CONCACAF Gold Cup players
Copa Centroamericana-winning players
A.D. Carmelita footballers
C.S. Herediano footballers
LA Galaxy players
Brujas FC players
Municipal Liberia footballers
Chivas USA players
Comunicaciones F.C. players
Deportivo Saprissa players
Persepolis F.C. players
Costa Rican expatriate footballers
Expatriate soccer players in the United States
Expatriate footballers in Guatemala
Expatriate footballers in Iran
Liga FPD players
Major League Soccer players
Persian Gulf Pro League players
Costa Rican expatriate sportspeople in the United States
FIFA Century Club